Toutes peines confondues is a 1992 French crime drama film starring Mathilda May. It was filmed and produced at locations in France and Switzerland, and bases on the 1985 novel Sweetheart by Andrew Coburn.

Plot 
The French detective superintendent Christophe Vade (Patrick Bruel) investigates the murder of an elderly French couple in the French Alps. In the course of his investigation he encounters Jeanne Gardella (Mathilda May), the wife of the businessman Antoine Gardella (Jacques Dutronc), a member of organized crime, and the son of the murdered couple. Antoine Gardella and his wife Jeanne live harmoniously, but Jeanne Gardella was forced by Thurson (Vernon Dobtcheff), a dubious agent of Interpol to her "role as wife" in the context of an undercover action against the European organized crime. Despite his criminal background, Jeanne loves her husband. Thurson also urges Christophe Vade to investigate Gardella and his wife in connection with the murder of those parents, and to get an additional pressure medium to gouge Jeanne Gardella to continue that farce. Thurson does not explain that plan either to inspector Vade or Jeanne Gardella, who fell in love, finally tolerated by Antoine Gardella who accepts that his wife was forced to that undercover action by Thurson. Tightly interwoven with the main story, the subplot plays in the milieu of the Swiss city of Zürich, and the advances of the brutal and corrupt city police officer Scatamacchia (Hans Heinz Moser) against a hostess allow a very personal view on Scandurat (Bruce Myers), Gardella's business partner and close friend. Finally, Vadella is forced to kill Vade and Jeanne, but refuses and choices suicide, to meet the unwritten rules within the organized crime.

Cast 
 Patrick Bruel as Christophe Vade 
 Jacques Dutronc as Antoine Gardella
 Mathilda May as Jeanne Gardella 
 Sophie Broustal as Laura 
 Vernon Dobtcheff as Thurston 
 Bruce Myers as Scandurat 
 Joël Barbouth as Husquin 
 Christophe Brault as Blodgett 
 Eric Da Silva as Roselli 
 Jean Dautremay as Deckler 
 Jocelyn-Clair Durvel as Blue 
 Hans Heinz Moser as Scatamacchia 
 Michael Pas as Nordixen 
 Bernard Waver as Roger Silas 
 Jürgen Zwingel as Kimbler
 Joseph Malerba as Inspector Nolo

Background and production 
The film bases on the 1985 novel Sweetheart by Andrew Coburn. Toutes peines confondues premiered on 8 April 1992 in France, in Belgium on 4 June 1992, in Germany on 27 August 1992 and in Sweden on 30 July 1993. The film was shot and produced at locations in the French Alps, and partially in Lyon and in Zürich. For international use, Toutes peines confondues was also titled Sweatheart.

References

External links 

1992 films
French crime drama films
1990s French-language films
1992 crime drama films
Films shot in Zürich
Films shot in France
Films directed by Michel Deville
Films set in France
Films set in the Alps
1990s French films